Barandal (officially, Barangay Barandal) is an industrial barangay of the city of Calamba in the province of Laguna, Philippines. It is geographically situated in the middle of the city. It houses various residential areas like Amaia Scapes by Ayala Land, Vista Hills by Filinvest Land, Calamba Hills Village Phase 2 by TESCO, Crescent Knoll by Major Homes, Laguna Buenavista Executive Homes by TESCO, Carmel Village Phase 2, Chateau Milano by TESCO, Andrea Paz Subdivision, and GK-Philipps Pabahay. The barangay is also the location of several companies in the Calamba Premier Industrial Park (CPIP).

Geography
Neighboring barangays:
West - Palo-Alto and Punta
East - Batino and Prinza
South - Turbina
North - Mayapa

Sitios and puroks
Purok I
Purok II
Purok III
Purok IV
Purok V
Purok VI

Demography

Schools & Industries
Pre-elementary
Barandal Day Care Center

Elementary
Barandal Elementary School

Secondary
Holy Trinity Academy of Calamba Inc.
St. Francis Assisi College System
Calamba Premiere Industrial Park
Nestle
Avon
Samsung
Fast Logistics

Other information
Classification - Rural
Zoning Classification - Growth Management - 1
Fiesta - June 13
Distance to Poblacion - 4 km. (+-)
Travel time to Poblacion - 20 minutes

References

External links
Official website of the Provincial Government of Laguna

Barangays of Calamba, Laguna